Tapuwa Kapini is a football goalkeeper and member of the Zimbabwe national football team.

He is known in Zimbabwe for his style of play where he drives the ball into the center of the pitch like an outfield player.

On 10 February 2015, Kapini join Highlands Park on a free transfer.

References

External links

1980 births
Living people
Zimbabwean footballers
Zimbabwean expatriate footballers
Zimbabwean expatriate sportspeople in South Africa
Association football goalkeepers
Zimbabwe international footballers
Expatriate soccer players in South Africa
Highlanders F.C. players
Platinum Stars F.C. players
AmaZulu F.C. players
Highlands Park F.C. players
Sekhukhune United F.C. players
2004 African Cup of Nations players
2006 Africa Cup of Nations players
Sportspeople from Harare